Qasba Gujrat is a small town in District Muzaffargarh, Punjab, Pakistan. The city is home to a Pak-Arab Refinery as well as a PSO oil depot and WAPDA electricity grid. Wheat, cotton and sugar cane, mangoes, citrus, guavas, and pomegranates are grown in this area. The current National Assembly Member is Malik Ghulam Raza Rabbani Khar of NA-183 (Muzaffargarh-III).

References

Populated places in Muzaffargarh District